Hurricane, also known as Hurricane Girls, are a Serbian girl group. The original line-up, formed by Zoran Milinković in November 2017, consisted of three members: Sanja Vučić, Ivana Nikolić and Ksenia Knežević. They are best known for representing Serbia at the Eurovision Song Contest 2021 in Rotterdam, Netherlands, with the song "Loco Loco". In 2022, the three original members left the group and were replaced by three new members: Jovana Radić, Sara Kourouma and Miona Srećković.

Career

They sing mostly in their native language Serbian and have also sung songs in English on some occasions. Hurricane aimed to be recognized globally; they had two planned songs for Universal (as of November 2019), and in September 2018 collaborated with Hollywood producer Stephen Belafonte.

Following their participation in the 2020 edition of Beovizija (second semi-final night, 29 February; final night, 1 March), they were to represent Serbia at the Eurovision Song Contest 2020, with the song "Hasta la vista". However, on 18 March 2020, the event was cancelled due to the COVID-19 pandemic. On 23 November 2020, it was confirmed that they would remain as the Serbia's representatives in the 2021 contest, and their song "Loco Loco", was presented in March 2021. They performed in the second semi-final of the contest on 18 May, where they qualified to the final. In the final, they finished in 15th place, receiving 102 points.

On 4 May 2022, it was announced that the current line-up of the group would part ways after a farewell tour, after which the members would embark on solo careers. It was also announced that the casting process for new members would begin shortly, while retaining the Hurricane name. The group's last single as Vučić, Nikolić and Knežević, "Wow", was released on 19 June 2022.

The group, with its new lineup of Jovana Radić, Sara Kourouma and Miona Srećković participated in Pesma za Evroviziju '23 with the song "Zumi zimi zami" in order to represent Serbia in the Eurovision Song Contest 2023 and placed 12th in the final.

Lineups
Current
Jovana Radić (2022–present)
Sara Kourouma (2022–present)
Miona Srećković (2022–present)

Former
Sanja Vučić (2017–2022)
Ivana Nikolić (2017–2022)
Ksenia Knežević (2017–2022)

Discography

Singles

References

External links

Serbian girl groups
Serbian pop music groups
Contemporary R&B musical groups
Musical groups established in 2017
Eurovision Song Contest entrants for Serbia
Eurovision Song Contest entrants of 2020
Eurovision Song Contest entrants of 2021
Pesma za Evroviziju contestants
2017 establishments in Serbia
Beovizija contestants
Beovizija winners